Dharavandhoo (Dhivehi: ދަރަވަންދޫ) is one of the inhabited islands of Baa Atoll.

Geography

Ecology

This island is surrounded by clear waters known as Dharavandhoo Thila and Hanifaru Bay; which are famous amongst divers around the world, for it is a sanctuary for a variety of marine life, including manta rays and whale sharks. This globally renowned eco-life zone is now strictly protected by law.

Demography

Governance
The island is administered by an Island Council consisting of five councillors elected by the people of the island.

Economy
The economy is mainly based on tourism related activities, fishery and agriculture, though most of the educated run their own businesses or are employed with work in Male (the capital city of Maldives). 

The island has a powerhouse, run by a utility company.

Education
Dharavandhoo has a Children's Nursery School. The education system is only available up to secondary school; further education is sought from Male' or elsewhere.

Healthcare
The island has its own health centre.

Transportation
Dharavandhoo Airport was opened on 17 October 2012.
Inner harbour was first dredged by MTCC, in the last four months of 1997. There is also a breakwater jetty.

Sport
Dharavandhoo has two football grounds.

Religion
The island has two mosques.

Culture
The citizens of the island are all Dhivehi speaking.

Poetry and literature

Dharavandhoo is a significant island in poetry and Dhivehi literature. Most popular poets and linguists were found in Dharavandhoo's Hussain Edhurukaleyfaanu family.  
The most famous Maldivean scholar is Shaikh Hussain Salahudhdheen (father of Hon. Ibrahim Shihab, Hon.Adnan Hussain, First lady Her Excellency Fathimath Saeed (Wife of Amimn Didi), First lady Her Excellency Mariyam Saeed (Wife of President Ibrahim Nasir)and His Brother Abdullah Kamaludhdheen (father of Chief Justice Shaikh Mohamed Jameel Didi and Moosa Jameel)'s mother Thuththu Manike is a grand daughter of Dharavandhoo Edhuru kaleyfaanu.
Famous poets Mr.Yoosuf Alifulhu and Mr.Saeed Alifulhu are also from EdhuruKaleyfaanu family. Mr.Ahmed Nashid and Mr.Abdullah Muaz are also well known poets in Maldives.

Gallery

References

External links
 https://maps.google.com/maps?ll=5.168566,73.144484&spn=0.062573,0.090895&t=h&z=14&lci=com.panoramio.all
https://web.archive.org/web/20081121040725/http://www.baa.gov.mv/contents/islands/dharavandhoo.html
https://www.facebook.com/groups/231176730273332/

Islands of the Maldives